Smoking Gun may refer to:

 Smoking gun, an object or fact that serves as conclusive evidence of a crime or similar act
 The Smoking Gun, a website that posts legal documents, arrest records, and police mugshots
 The Smoking Gunns, a wrestling tag team
 JFK: The Smoking Gun, a documentary and book on Howard Donahue's theory on the Kennedy assassination
 Smoking Gun Interactive, video game company

Music
 "Smoking Gun" (song), 1986, by Robert Cray
 Smoking Gun (album), 2009, by Angus Stone under the name Lady of the Sunshine

Television
 Smoking Gun (TV series), a 2014 Japanese drama
 "The Smoking Gun" (Ashes To Ashes), a television episode of British television series Ashes To Ashes
 Smoking Gun - Minkan Kasōken Chōsa'in Nagareda Midori, 2012 Japanese mystery manga series

See also
 Smoking gun memo, the note of a secret 23 July 2002 meeting concerning the Iraq War
 Smoking Guns, 2016 British film
 
 truTV Presents: World's Dumbest..., a cable television series formerly carrying the brand of the Smoking Gun website